Honeywell is an area of Barnsley in South Yorkshire, England.

Geography of Barnsley